= Patalet Geon =

Chadian government minister

Patalet Geon is a former Minister of Tourism Development, Culture, and the Arts in the Republic of Chad. Serving from June 2020 to April 20, 2021, he assumed the position following the departure of Madeleine Alingue.
